Top Hero is a 2010 Bangladeshi political action thriller film written and directed by Montazur Rahman Akbar, he also produced the film under the banner Star Plus. It feature Shakib Khan and Apu Biswas in the lead roles.

Plot 
Hero's (Shakib Khan) father was murdered in hijacking incident. His sister could not bear the grief and commits suicide. Now Hero wants to punish the people who were responsible for his loss. So he files a police report. But the police takes no actions. Finally Hero takes matters to his own hands.

Cast 
 Shakib Khan as Haroon a.k.a. Hero
 Apu Biswas as Kahini
 Prabir Mitra as Sir
 Misha Sawdagor as Badsha
 Michael
 Rehana Jolly
 Rebeka Rouf
 Parthona Fardin Dighi
 Zillur Rahman
 Raju Sarkar
 Shiba Shanu
 Kabila as Kabila
 Nasrin
 Sagor Shikder
 Jahidul Hasan

Soundtrack

References

External links 

 
 

2010s Bengali-language films
Bangladeshi romantic action films
Bengali-language Bangladeshi films
Bangladeshi remakes of Indian films
2010s romantic action films